Lycaugesia is a genus of moths of the family Noctuidae. The genus was erected by Paul Dognin in 1910.

Lycaugesia Hampson, 1912 is also listed as a synonym of Quandara Nye, 1975.

Species
Lycaugesia calochroia Dyar, 1914 Panama
Lycaugesia epistigma Dyar, 1914 Panama
Lycaugesia flavimargo Hampson, 1910 Brazil (Amazonas)
Lycaugesia fuscicosta Hampson, 1910 Panama
Lycaugesia fuscifascia Dognin, 1910 French Guiana
Lycaugesia gratificula Dyar, 1914 Panama
Lycaugesia hatita Schaus, 1911 Costa Rica
Lycaugesia hemipennis Dyar, 1914 Panama
Lycaugesia homogramma Schaus, 1915 Costa Rica
Lycaugesia melasoma Hampson, 1910 Panama
Lycaugesia microzale Dyar, 1914 Panama
Lycaugesia monostella Dyar, 1914 Panama
Lycaugesia perpurpura Dyar, 1914 Panama
Lycaugesia postnigrescens Dyar, 1914 Panama
Lycaugesia pseudura Dyar, 1914 Panama
Lycaugesia punctilinea Hampson, 1910 Sri Lanka
Lycaugesia rubribasis Hampson, 1918 Panama
Lycaugesia rubripicta Hampson, 1910 Panama
Lycaugesia rubripuncta Hampson, 1910 Sri Lanka
Lycaugesia semiblanda Dyar, 1914 Panama
Lycaugesia semiclara Dyar, 1914 Panama
Lycaugesia stigmaleuca Dyar, 1914 Panama
Lycaugesia teneralis (Walker, [1866]) Honduras

References

Acontiinae